USS Jimetta (SP-878) was a United States Navy patrol vessel in commission from 1917 to 1918.

Jimetta was built as the private motor yacht Frances II in 1915 by the New York Yacht, Launch & Engine Company at Morris Heights in the Bronx, New York. She later was renamed Jimetta.

On 16 July 1917, the U.S. Navy acquired Jimetta from her owner, Clement Studebaker of South Bend, Indiana, for use as a section patrol boat during World War I. She was commissioned as USS Jimetta (SP-878) on 11 September 1917 at the New York Navy Yard at Brooklyn, New York.

Assigned to the 3rd Naval District, Jimetta served as a patrol and dispatch boat in Long Island Sound for the rest of World War I.

Jimetta was decommissioned on 11 December 1918 and returned to Studebaker the same day.

References

Department of the Navy Naval History and Heritage Command Online Library of Selected Images: Civilian Ships Frances II (Motor Boat, 1915); Later renamed Jimetta. Was USS Jimetta (SP-878) in 1917–1918

Patrol vessels of the United States Navy
World War I patrol vessels of the United States
Ships built in Morris Heights, Bronx
1915 ships
Individual yachts
Ships built by the New York Yacht, Launch & Engine Company